Capelle-lès-Hesdin (literally Capelle near Hesdin) is a commune in the Pas-de-Calais department in the Hauts-de-France region of France.

Geography
A village situated some 17 miles (27 km) southeast of Montreuil-sur-Mer on the D134 road.

Population

See also
Communes of the Pas-de-Calais department

References

Capelleleshesdin
Artois